In enzymology, a pteridine oxidase is an enzyme that catalyzes the chemical reaction

2-amino-4-hydroxypteridine + O2  2-amino-4,7-dihydroxypteridine + (?)

Thus, the two substrates of this enzyme are 2-amino-4-hydroxypteridine and O2, whereas its product is 2-amino-4,7-dihydroxypteridine.

This enzyme belongs to the family of oxidoreductases, specifically those acting on CH or CH2 groups with oxygen as acceptor. The systematic name of this enzyme class is 2-amino-4-hydroxypteridine:oxygen oxidoreductase (7-hydroxylating).

References

 

EC 1.17.3
Enzymes of unknown structure